Osmo Vilho Vepsäläinen (4 September 1931, Nilsiä - 8 November 2017, Varkaus) is a Finnish civil servant and politician. He was a member of the Parliament of Finland from 1975 to 1979 and again from 1983 to 1987, representing the Finnish People's Democratic League (SKDL).

References

1931 births
Living people
People from Nilsiä
Finnish People's Democratic League politicians
Members of the Parliament of Finland (1975–79)
Members of the Parliament of Finland (1983–87)
21st-century Finnish politicians